Periboeum pubescens is a species of beetle in the family Cerambycidae. It was described by Olivier in 1790.

References

Elaphidiini
Beetles described in 1790